Louis-Edmond Hamelin,  (21 March 1923 – February 11, 2020) was  a Canadian geographer, professor, and author born in Saint-Didace, Quebec, Canada, best known for his studies of Northern Canada.

Hamelin created the Centre for Northern Studies at the Université Laval in Québec and was rector of the Université du Québec à Trois-Rivières from 1978 to 1983. He was also a member of the Northwest Territories Legislative Council.

Hamelin specialized in Northern and Aboriginal peoples studies. He coined several words concerning the North, some of which (such as Nordicity) came to enter the English vocabulary. His seminal work was the 1958 Nordicité Canadienne (translated 1979 as Canadian Nordicity: It's Your North, Too). He was an influence on proposals initiated in the 1960s for a massive development in Northern Canada called the Mid-Canada Corridor.

Honours
 1962 – Fellow of the Royal Society of Canada
 1972 – Léo-Pariseau Prize
 1972 – Pierre Chauveau Medal
 1974 – Officer of the Order of Canada
 1975 – Governor General's Award
 1976 – Royal Canadian Geographical Society's Massey Medal
 1982 – Gloire de l'Escolle Medal
 1982 – Molson Prize
 1987 – Léon-Gérin Prize
 1989 – Correspondent of Académie des Sciences Morales et Politiques (France)
 1994 – Ordre des francophones d'Amérique
 1998 – Grand officer of the National Order of Quebec
 2014 – Hubert Reeves Award

References

External links
Louis-Edmond Hamelin's Site

Further reading
Louis-Edmond Hamelin. Canadian Nordicity: It's Your North, Too. Montreal: Harvest House, 1979. 

1923 births
2020 deaths
Canadian geographers
Canadian non-fiction writers
Academic staff of Université Laval
Academic staff of the Université du Québec à Trois-Rivières
Canadian university and college chief executives
Fellows of the Royal Society of Canada
Grand Officers of the National Order of Quebec
Officers of the Order of Canada
Governor General's Award-winning non-fiction writers
Members of the Legislative Assembly of the Northwest Territories
Members of the Académie des sciences morales et politiques
Massey Medal recipients
Université de Montréal alumni
Université Laval alumni
Writers from Quebec